Yana Ucsha (possibly from Quechua yana black, very dark, uqsha (locally), uqsa high altitude grass, Hispanicized spellings Yana Ucsha, Yanaucsha, Yanauscha, Yanahucsha, also Yanauksha) is a ridge in the Huaytapallana mountain range in the Andes of Peru, about  high.

The ridge is situated in the southern part of the main sector of the range, south of Huaytapallana. It lies in the Junín Region, Huancayo Province, Huancayo District.

Beside the lake Yana Ucsha there are two larger lakes nearby named Jatuncocha and Carhuacocha.

References 

Mountains of Peru
Mountains of Junín Region
Lakes of Peru
Lakes of Junín Region